María Teresa de las Mercedes Wilms Montt (8 September 1893 – 24 December 1921; pseudonyms Tebal and Teresa de la Cruz), also known as Thérèse Wilms Montt, was a Chilean writer, poet, and anarcha-feminist. Described as "embodying sexual aberrance and social prophesy", she was a friend of the writers Ramón Gómez de la Serna, Enrique Gómez Carrillo, Joaquín Edwards Bello, Víctor Domingo Silva, and Ramón Valle-Inclán.

Biography
A scion of the Montt family, she was born in Viña del Mar, Chile, to Luz Victoria Montt y Montt and Federico Guillermo Wilms y Brieba. She was the couple's second daughter, and she had seven sisters. Educated by governesses and private tutors, she married Gustavo Balmaceda Valdés at the age of 17, against the will of her family. They had two children, Elisa "Chita" (1911) and Sylvia Luz (1913).

In Santiago, she joined the city's active cultural life.

Between 1912 and 1915, they resided in Iquique because of her husband's work. It was here that she began her relationship with feminists, trade unionists, and even Masons, and became associated with nascent reformist movements. She used the pseudonym Tebal when she was first published in the Iquique newspaper. After her husband returned to Santiago he discovered the affair which Wilms Montt had with his cousin, Vicente Zañartu Balmaceda. Because of it, the men of the Balmaceda Valdés family held a 'family court' in 1915, and decided Wilms Montt's punishment would be to spend time at the Convento de la Preciosa Sangre. Here, she kept a diary and, depressed, made her first suicide attempt on March 29, 1916.

In June 1916, Vicente Huidobro helped her escape from the convent and she fled with him to Buenos Aires. The city's cosmopolitan intellectual circle had a positive effect on her, she became acquainted with writers Victoria Ocampo, Jorge Borges, and feminist-fashionista "Pele" Pelegrina Pastorino. The following year, she published  Inquietudes Sentimentales, which was followed by Los Tres Cantos, where she explored eroticism and spirituality. After an admirer, Horacio Ramos Mejía, committed suicide in Wilms Montt's home, she left for New York City during World War I, but, after being accused of being a German spy, she was deported to Spain. Here, she became the muse of Julio Romero de Torres, who introduced her to the writers Gómez de la Serna, Gómez Carrillo, and Ramón Valle-Inclán. In Madrid, using the pseudonym Teresa de la Cruz, she published "En la Quietud del Mármol" and "Anuarí". Her travels took her to London and Paris, but she resided in Madrid. She was reunited with her daughters in Paris in 1920 after 5 years of separation through the efforts of her father, who was on a diplomatic mission. However, the pain of separating from them again when they returned to Chile led to a terrible depression.

She committed suicide at the Hotel Laenaec in Paris on 24 December 1921, from an overdose of Veronal at the age of 28 years.  She is buried in the famous Père Lachaise Cemetery.

Her life is remembered in the 2009 film Teresa: Crucificada por amar by director Tatiana Gaviola.

Published works 

 Inquietudes sentimentales, Buenos Aires, 1917, 
 Los tres cantos, Buenos Aires, 1917
 En la quietud del mármol, Casa Ed. Blanco, Madrid, 1918; translated as In the Stillness of Marble, Snuggly Books, 2019
 Anuarí, Casa Ed. Blanco, Madrid, 1919
 Cuentos para hombres que son todavía niños, Buenos Aires, Argentina, 1919
 Lo que no se ha dicho, antología, Editorial Nascimento, Santiago de Chile, 1922, 
 Obras completas, compilada por Ruth González-Vergara, Editorial Grijalbo, Barcelona, 1994

Gallery

References

External links
 Teresa Wilms Montt @ Memoria Chilena, Biblioteca Nacional de Chile

1893 births
1921 suicides
People from Valparaíso Province
Anarcha-feminists
Barbiturates-related deaths
Chilean agnostics
Chilean anarchists
Chilean people of Catalan descent
Chilean people of German descent
Drug-related suicides in France
Montt family
Women diarists
Chilean women poets
20th-century Chilean poets
20th-century Chilean women writers
20th-century Chilean non-fiction writers
Chilean feminist writers
20th-century diarists